Perfluorobutanesulfonic acid (PFBS) is a chemical compound having a four-carbon fluorocarbon chain and a sulfonic acid functional group. It is stable and unreactive because of the strength of carbon–fluorine bonds. It can occur in the form of a colorless liquid or a corrosive solid. Its conjugate base is perfluorobutanesulfonate (also called nonaflate) which functions as the hydrophobe in fluorosurfactants.

Since June 2003, 3M has used PFBS as a replacement for the persistent, toxic, and bioaccumulative compound perfluorooctanesulfonic acid (PFOS) in its Scotchgard stain repellents. 3M markets surfactant with PFBS in two fluorosurfactants.

Safety 
PFBS has a half-life of a little over one month in humans, much shorter than PFOS with 5.4 years. PFBS is persistent in the environment. Studies have not yet been specifically conducted to determine safety in humans.

The ECHA decision adding PFBS and its salts to the REACH Regulation Candidate List of Substances of Very High Concern states:“The combined intrinsic properties justifying the inclusion as a substance for which there is scientific evidence of probable serious effects to human health and the environment which give rise to an equivalent level of concern are the following: very high persistence, high mobility in water and soil, high potential for long-range transport, and difficulty of remediation and water purification as well as moderate bioaccumulation in humans. The observed probable serious effects for human health and the environment are thyroid hormonal disturbances and reproductive toxicity seen in rodents, and effects on liver, kidney and haematological system in rats, hormonal disturbances and effects on reproduction in marine medaka fish and effects on expression of hormone receptors in tadpoles. Together, these elements lead to a very high potential for irreversible effects.”

Legislation and Regulation

European Union 
On 2020-01-16, PFBS and its salts were added to the REACH Regulation Candidate List of Substances of Very High Concern (SVHCs) on the grounds of "Equivalent level of concern having probable serious effects to human health (Article 57(f) - human health)" and "Equivalent level of concern having probable serious effects to the environment (Article 57(f) - environment)".

United States 
There is no national standard for PFBS. However, several states have proposed regulating PFBS in drinking water including Michigan either as contamination standards, guidance or health advisories.

In 2020 Michigan adopted drinking water standards for 5 previously unregulated PFAS compounds, including PFBS which has a maximum contaminant level (MCL) of 420 parts per trillion (ppt).

See also
 PFOA
 PFNA
 FBSA
Perfluorinated alkylated substances (PFAS)
Timeline of events related to per- and polyfluoroalkyl substances (PFAS)

References

Anionic surfactants
Perfluorosulfonic acids